Karl Augustus "Dick" Esleeck (August 18, 1903 – December 10, 1952) was an American football coach.  He served as the head football coach at the University of Richmond  from 1948 until 1950, compiling a record of 10–18–2.  Esleeck attended and played college football at Virginia Agricultural and Mechanical College and Polytechnic Institute—now known as Virginia Tech—finishing his career in 1926.  His accomplishments at Tech led to his induction into the Virginia Tech Sports Hall of Fame.  

Prior to his college coaching stint at Richmond, he coached several high school teams to state championship. He died after a long illness in 1952. In 1977, Esleeck was inducted into the Virginia Sports Hall of Fame, the state-wide organization that recognizes athletic achievements by state natives, or who played or coached for teams in the state.

Head coaching record

References

External links
 

1903 births
1952 deaths
American football halfbacks
Richmond Spiders football coaches
Virginia Tech Hokies football players
High school football coaches in Virginia
Sportspeople from Portsmouth, Virginia